Kepa Blanco González (born 13 January 1984), sometimes known simply as Kepa, is a Spanish retired professional footballer who played as a striker, and a manager.

He was best known for his spell with Sevilla, for which he appeared in 58 competitive games and scored 14 goals, winning four major titles including two UEFA Cups. In La Liga he also represented Getafe, amassing totals of 61 matches and 11 goals over six seasons.

Club career
Kepa was born in Marbella, Province of Málaga. His forename was of Basque origin, as his mother hailed from Biscay. Brought up through the ranks of Sevilla FC, he played two La Liga matches with the first team in the 2004–05 season, and established himself as an important attacking player with the Andalusian club in the following two years, but almost exclusively as a substitute.

In 2006–07, even after having scored a hat-trick against Levante UD in the league opener, and another three goals in the victorious campaign in the UEFA Cup, Kepa fell out of favour, and on 22 January 2007 he went on loan to West Ham United in the Premier League until the end of the campaign, with the option of a permanent transfer available; on his debut for the Hammers, eight days later, he netted in the 77th minute after only being on for 70 seconds with his first touch of the game against Liverpool.

In July 2007, Kepa agreed to a four-year deal with top-flight club Getafe CF, with Sevilla retaining the option of repurchasing the player the next season or the one after that. During his first year he appeared sparingly for the UEFA Cup quarter-finalists, scoring in a 2–0 home win over Real Murcia after coming from the bench on 21 October but also being sent off after kicking an opponent; from that moment onwards he rarely had a match, not even in the Copa del Rey (nine league matches in two full seasons combined).

On 5 August 2010, Kepa was sold to Recreativo de Huelva of the Segunda División as Adrián Colunga moved in the opposite direction. He made only 19 appearances out of a possible 42 in his first year, being released from contract in April 2012 after no competitive minutes during the campaign whatsoever.

In 2014, after one season in the second tier with CD Guadalajara, where he was also sparingly played and also suffered team relegation, and one year of inactivity, 30-year-old Kepa retired from football, being appointed assistant coach at amateurs UD San Pedro in his native region shortly after.

Honours

Club
Sevilla
Copa del Rey: 2006–07
UEFA Cup: 2005–06, 2006–07

International
Spain U23
Mediterranean Games: 2005

References

External links

1984 births
Living people
People from Marbella
Sportspeople from the Province of Málaga
Spanish people of Basque descent
Spanish footballers
Footballers from Andalusia
Association football forwards
La Liga players
Segunda División players
Segunda División B players
Sevilla Atlético players
Sevilla FC players
UEFA Cup winning players
Getafe CF footballers
Recreativo de Huelva players
CD Guadalajara (Spain) footballers
Premier League players
West Ham United F.C. players
Spain youth international footballers
Spain under-21 international footballers
Spain under-23 international footballers
Competitors at the 2005 Mediterranean Games
Mediterranean Games medalists in football
Mediterranean Games gold medalists for Spain
Spanish expatriate footballers
Expatriate footballers in England
Spanish expatriate sportspeople in England
Spanish football managers